Ada Chard Williams (c. 1875–1900) was a baby farmer who was convicted of strangling to death 21-month-old Selina Ellen Jones in Barnes in London in September 1899.

Florence Jones, a young unmarried mother, had read an advert in the local newspaper which offered to find homes for unwanted children. She agreed to pay £5 to a Mrs Hewetson (Ada Chard Williams) but could only give her £3 on the day. She returned later with the balance and found that Mrs Hewetson and Selina had vanished.

Florence reported the matter to the police. Ada Chard Williams wrote a letter to the police denying the crime but in effect admitting she was a baby farmer who bought and sold babies for profit. The police soon discovered that Mrs Hewetson was Ada Chard Williams. However, they had no body with which to prove there had been a murder, at least not until Selina's corpse was washed up on the bank of the Thames at Battersea.

Braxton Hicks, the coroner who carried out the subsequent inquest, pointed out that the knots in the cord, a "fisherman's bend", had been found on three other dead bodies of children. On the child's head there was a very large bruise, which suggested that someone had taken the child by the legs, and struck it against a wall before it was strangled.

Like Amelia Dyer, Ada Chard Williams had her own "signature" way of tying up bodies she wished to dispose of, using a knot called a Fisherman's knot or bend and which was a crucial piece of evidence at her trial at the Old Bailey on 16 and 17 February 1900. She was hanged, aged 24, in the yard of Newgate Prison on 6 March 1900, the last woman to be hanged there.

She was suspected of killing other children although no proceedings were brought.

However, it was suggested that she might not have been the one who murdered the children as it was clear that she and her husband were both involved in the active fraud that surrounded their lives and the baby farming. When considering whether to respite her conviction it was noted that in all crimes other than murder that the influence of a husband could be used as a defence and it was thought more likely that it was her husband that had murdered the children and even wrapped them up and that all Ada Williams had done was assist and dispose of the packages, all under the influence of her husband. The jury found the husband at the least an accessory after the fact but the judge noted that he was not on trial and could not be convicted and it was noted that considering his probable involvement, he got away without any punishment whatsoever whilst Ada Williams suffered the final penalty. Her husband was 47-year-old whilst Ada Williams was only 24-years-old.

See also
Richmond Child Murder

References

Sources

External links
 
 

1870s births
1899 murders in the United Kingdom
1900 deaths
1890s murders in London
19th-century executions by England and Wales
19th-century English criminals
19th-century English women
Baby farming
British female murderers
English murderers of children
English people convicted of murder
Executed English people
Executed English women
Infanticide
People convicted of murder by England and Wales
People executed for murder
People from Barnes, London
Suspected serial killers